Jama Mahlalela (born 1980) is a Swazi-Canadian basketball coach, currently an assistant coach for the Golden State Warriors of the National Basketball Association (NBA). Previously he has served as the head coach of Raptors 905 of the NBA G League and an assistant coach for the Toronto Raptors.

Career

University of British Columbia
Mahlalela played basketball for the UBC Thunderbirds. He played for five years, served as a team captain, and helped the team win a Canada West title in 2003. Mahlalela graduated in 2004 with a Bachelor of Kinesiology degree from UBC and the Jama Mahlalela Award was created in his honour.

Toronto Raptors (2013–2021)
Mahlalela started with the Toronto Raptors in 2006 as a member of the community development staff, leading the Raptors Basketball Academy and various clinics throughout Canada. He was named director of basketball operations for NBA Asia in 2009 and oversaw the League’s clinics, youth programs and elite-level development from his base in Hong Kong. Mahlalela began his tenure as an assistant coach in the 2013–14 NBA season.

On June 19, 2018, Mahlalela was named as the new head coach for the Raptors' affiliated Raptors 905 of the NBA G League. 

On December 4, 2020, it was announced that Mahlalela had rejoined the Toronto Raptors coaching staff as an assistant behind head coach Nick Nurse.

Golden State Warriors (2021–present) 
On August 13, 2021, the Golden State Warriors hired Mahlalela as an assistant coach and director of player development. In Mahlalela's first season, the Warriors won the 2022 NBA Finals against the Boston Celtics in 6 games.

Personal life
Mahlalela ran many youth basketball organizations while he was with the Raptors. He has also worked for NBA Cares.

See also
 List of foreign NBA coaches

References

1980 births
Living people
Canadian men's basketball coaches
Golden State Warriors assistant coaches
Raptors 905 coaches
Swazi basketball coaches
Swazi emigrants to Canada
Swazi sportsmen
Toronto Raptors assistant coaches
UBC Thunderbirds basketball players